The 2005 Torneo Godó  was a men's professional tennis tournament that was part of the International Series Gold of the 2005 ATP Tour. It was the 53rd edition of the Torneo Godó tennis tournament and it took place from 18 April until 24 April 2005 at the Real Club de Tenis Barcelona in Barcelona, Catalonia, Spain. Eighth-seeded Rafael Nadal won the singles title.

Finals

Singles

 Rafael Nadal defeated  Juan Carlos Ferrero, 6–1, 7–6, 6–3
 It was Nadal's 4th singles title of the year and the 5th of his career.

Doubles

 Leander Paes /  Nenad Zimonjić defeated  Feliciano López /  Rafael Nadal, 6–3, 6–3

References

External links
 ITF tournament edition details

 
2005
2005 ATP Tour
2005 in Catalan sport
Godo